Kang Ha-guk (born 25 April 1952) was the Minister of Public Health of North Korea from 2013 to 2017, when he was replaced by Jang Jun-sang. He was appointed on April 9, 2014.  As of January 2014, he was also reportedly director of the Central Committee of the Korea-China Friendship Association.  He was among the dignitaries who greeted Chinese Vice President Li Yuanchao during his state visit to Pyongyang in July 2013.

References

Living people
Health ministers of North Korea
1952 births
Workers' Party of Korea politicians